The Journal of Social Work Education is a quarterly peer-reviewed academic journal dedicated to education in the fields of social work and social welfare. It was established in 1965 as the Journal of Education for Social Work, obtaining its current name in 1985. It is published by Taylor & Francis on behalf of the Council on Social Work Education. The editor-in-chief is Danielle Parrish (Baylor University). According to the Journal Citation Reports, the journal has a 2017 impact factor of 1.000.

References

External links

Social work education
Social work journals
Education journals
Taylor & Francis academic journals
Academic journals associated with learned and professional societies of the United States
Publications established in 1965
Quarterly journals
English-language journals